Herbert Vesely (31 March 1931 – 13 July 2002) was an Austrian film director and screenwriter. He directed 17 films between 1955 and 1988.

Selected filmography
  (1955)
 The Bread of Those Early Years (1962) — (based on the novel The Bread of Those Early Years)
  (co-director: Peter Schamoni, 1969) — (based on a novel by Esteban Eulogio López)
 Das Bastardzeichen (1970, TV film) — (based on the novel Bend Sinister)
 Ulla oder Die Flucht in die schwarzen Wälder (1974, TV film)
  (1974–1975, TV series, 3 episodes)
 Depression (1975, TV film) — (based on a book by )
 Der kurze Brief zum langen Abschied (1978, TV film) — (based on the novel Short Letter, Long Farewell)
 Egon Schiele – Exzess und Bestrafung (1980)
 Plaza Real (1988)

References

External links

1931 births
2002 deaths
Austrian film directors
Austrian television directors
Austrian male screenwriters
German-language film directors
20th-century Austrian screenwriters
20th-century Austrian male writers